Paramulia is a genus of moths belonging to the subfamily Tortricinae of the family Tortricidae. It consists of only one species, Paramulia laculetana, which is found in Venezuela.

The wingspan is about 29 mm. The wings are chestnut brown, sprinkled with brownish. The strigulation (fine streaks) and veins are browner. The hindwings are cream, slightly tinged brownish on the periphery.

Etymology
The generic name is a combination of the locality name (Páramo) and the genus name Eulia. The specific name refers to the locality name Laculeta.

See also
List of Tortricidae genera

References

Euliini
Monotypic moth genera
Taxa named by Józef Razowski
Moths of South America
Tortricidae genera